The 2013–14 season was West Ham Uniteds second campaign in the Premier League since being promoted in the 2011–12 season. It was West Ham's 18th Premier League campaign overall.

As well as competing in the Premier League, West Ham took part in the FA Cup and the League Cup, entering at the third and second rounds respectively. They were eliminated in the third round of the FA Cup following a 5–0 away defeat by Nottingham Forest. They reached the semi-finals of the League Cup before losing 9–0 on aggregate to Manchester City. West Ham finished in 13th place in the league.

Sam Allardyce took charge of his third full season as West Ham manager. Kevin Nolan captained West Ham for the third season running.

Season summary
 21 May 2013: West Ham announced the signing of Romania captain, left back Răzvan Raț, making him the first signing in this transfer window.
 21 May 2013: West Ham and Liverpool agree on a £15 million deal to bring Andy Carroll to Upton Park, with the striker yet to agree personal terms.
 22 May 2013: The Club announced that experienced striker Carlton Cole would not be offered a new contract. He was released together with young professionals Eoin Wearen, Jake Larkins, Jack Powell and Declan Hunt. Scholars Cheye Alexander, Nigel Seidu and Josh Siafa were also released.
 5 June 2013: West Ham announced the signing of Real Betis goalkeeper Adrián.
 18 June 2013: West Ham target Andy Carroll passes a medical ahead of a move to the club. Co-Chairman David Gold tweeted that Carroll had passed the medical "with flying colours". Carroll signed the following day on a six-year contract for a fee of £15 million.
 19 June 2013: West Ham announced the permanent signing of Andy Carroll from Liverpool, for an undisclosed, club record fee.
 20 June 2013: The club announced the signing of Stockport County youngster Danny Whitehead.
 1 July 2013: Winger Robert Hall left the club to become a player at Bolton Wanderers.
 13 August 2013: West Ham announced the signing of Liverpool winger Stewart Downing.
 17 August 2013: West Ham open their season with a 2–0 home win against newly promoted Cardiff City. On target were Joe Cole and captain Kevin Nolan. New signing Stewart Downing makes his debut, coming on as a substitute in the second half.
 24 August 2013: Stewart Downing starts for the first time as West Ham share the spoils with Newcastle in a 0–0 draw at St James' Park.
 27 August 2013: Ravel Morrison scores his first competitive goal for the club as West Ham beat League Two opposition Cheltenham Town in the League Cup second round.
 27 August 2013: French midfielder Alou Diarra suffers a serious knee ligament injury and is likely to miss the rest of the season.
 31 August 2013: West Ham lose their first game of the season at home to Stoke City, 1–0. Elliot Lee makes his Premier League debut for the club.
 5 September 2013: West Ham win the Ciutat de Barcelona Trophy in Barcelona. Mark Noble scores the only goal, a penalty, against Espanyol.
 9 September 2013: West Ham announce that striker Andy Carroll has suffered a new injury during his return to full training, and will be out of action for longer than was expected.
 10 September: The Hammers confirm the signing of Croatian forward Mladen Petrić on a free transfer.
 15 September: A 0–0 draw to Southampton sees West Ham remain unbeaten away from home so far this season. Ravel Morrison makes his first Premier League start for the club.
 19 September 2013: Leyton Orient fail in their bid to win a judicial review into the decision to grant West Ham the tenancy of the Olympic Stadium.
 21 September 2013: Mark Noble, having scored a penalty for West Ham to put them 2–1 ahead against Everton, becomes their first player to be dismissed this season after a second booking. Everton won 3–2 with late goals from Leighton Baines and Romelu Lukaku. Ravel Morrison scored his first Premier League goal for the club in the same game. The defeat leaves the Hammers without a win since the opening day of the season.
 24 September 2013: West Ham defeat Cardiff City 3–2 in the League Cup fourth round. After going ahead 2–0 from goals from Ravel Morrison and Matt Jarvis, Cardiff fought back to level at 2–2. A Ricardo Vaz Tê header late into the game proved to be decisive and sent West Ham into the next round, where they will face Burnley.
 28 September 2013: A 1–0 loss to newly promoted Hull City saw West Ham's run without a win stretch to five games. This was the club's first away defeat of the season and left them just one point above the relegation zone.
 6 October 2013: West Ham win their first away game of the season with a 0–3 victory against Tottenham Hotspur. This was their first win at White Hart Lane since 1999.
 14 October 2013: The club announce the re-signing of previously released striker Carlton Cole. The 30-year-old signed a three-month contract with a view to extend it in the future.
 19 October 2013: West Ham suffer a third-straight home defeat at the hands of Manchester City. An acrobatic Ricardo Vaz Tê effort halved the deficit to 2–1, but David Silva finished late on to secure the three points for City.
 27 October 2013: A 0–0 draw away to Swansea City saw West Ham pick up their sixth away point of the season. Carlton Cole came on as a second-half substitute in his first appearance since re-joining the club.
 29 October 2013: The Hammers advanced to the fifth round of the League Cup for the first time in three years by beating Championship leaders Burnley 2–0 at Turf Moor.
 2 November 2013: West Ham gain a point from a 0–0 draw against Aston Villa. The result saw them pick up their first point at home since the opening day's win against Cardiff City.
 9 November 2013: A 3–1 defeat away to Norwich City left the club one point above the relegation zone. Ravel Morrison scored the only goal for West Ham.
 23 November 2013: West Ham are defeated at home by London rivals Chelsea, 0–3. Former player Frank Lampard scores two with Oscar adding the third.
 30 November 2013: Carlton Cole scores his first goal since his return to the club in a 3–0 home win against Fulham.
 3 December 2013:  A midweek trip to Selhurst Park sees the Hammers lose 1–0. Crystal Palace player and former West Ham striker Marouane Chamakh gets the only goal.
 7 December 2013: West Ham are defeated 4–1 by Liverpool at Anfield. Three own goals are scored, including two by Joey O'Brien and Guy Demel; Martin Škrtel was at fault for the other. Kevin Nolan saw straight red and picked up a three-match ban.
 14 December 2013: A bottom of the table clash between Sunderland and West Ham ends 0–0 at Upton Park.
 18 December 2013: West Ham defeat Tottenham for the second time at White Hart Lane this season, this time in the League Cup quarter-finals. Late goals from Matt Jarvis and Modibo Maïga secured a 1–2 win and sent the Hammers into the semi-finals to set up a two-legged tie against Manchester City.
 21 December 2013: Carlton Cole scores his 50th league goal for West Ham in a 3–1 defeat by Manchester Utd at Old Trafford.
 26 December 2013: West Ham lose to Arsenal 1–3 placing them in 19th place and in the relegation zone.
 28 December 2013: West Ham draw 3–3 with West Bromwich Albion at Upton Park. Also in the news was the release of Croatian forward Mladen Petrić by the club. He had been at the club three months.
 1 January 2014: Fulham defeat West Ham 2–1 at Craven Cottage in a match that sees Kevin Nolan sent off for the second time in a month, banning him for four matches.
 5 January 2014: West Ham are knocked out from the FA Cup after losing 5–0 to Nottingham Forest.
 8 January 2014: West Ham suffer a second heavy defeat in a row in losing 6–0 to Manchester City in the semi-final of the Capital One Cup. This was their heaviest defeat of the season and Sam Allardyce's heaviest defeat as West Ham manager.
 11 January 2014: West Ham win their first game of 2014 with a 0–2 away victory to Cardiff City. Carlton Cole got the first with Mark Noble adding a second deep into injury time. Andy Carroll provided the assist for Noble's goal in his first appearance for the club this season. James Tomkins was sent off for a second bookable offence and picked up a one-match ban.
 21 January 2014: Manchester City win the second leg of the League Cup semi-final 0–3 to complete a record aggregate score for a semi-final, at 9–0.
 25 January 2014: West Ham sign Italian duo Marco Borriello and Antonio Nocerino on loan until the end of the season.
 29 January 2014: West Ham earn a point at Stamford Bridge against London rivals Chelsea in a 0–0 draw.
 1 February 2014: Kevin Nolan scores twice with Andy Carroll setting up both goals in a 2–0 home win against Swansea City. Winston Reid makes his return from injury. Andy Carroll is sent off for violent conduct.
 4 February 2014: The FA rejects West Ham's appeal against Andy Carroll's red card and his three-match ban is upheld.
 8 February 2014: With no Andy Carroll, Kevin Nolan scores a brace for the second consecutive match, against Aston Villa, propelling West Ham out of the relegation zone.
 11 February 2014: A 2–0 home win against Norwich City gives West Ham four consecutive clean sheets, the first time this has occurred since December 1985.
 19 February 2014: Ravel Morrison is loaned to Queens Park Rangers for 93 days, meaning he will be eligible to play for them in the Championship playoff final if they reach it; the loan includes a clause allowing West Ham to recall him after 28 days.
 22 February 2014: West Ham win their fourth-straight match, against Southampton, with goals from Matt Jarvis, Carlton Cole and Kevin Nolan. The win places West Ham into tenth in the Premier League table, their highest position since September.
 1 March 2014: The club's winning run comes to an end after a late Romelu Lukaku goal secures all three points for Everton at Goodison Park.
 8 March 2014: Andy Carroll scores his first goal of the season versus Stoke City, but it is not enough as West Ham lose 3–1.
 14 March 2014: Manager Sam Allardyce is named Premier League Manager of the Month for February 2014, the fifth time he has won the award.
 22 March 2014: Wayne Rooney scores a brace which sees the Hammers defeated 0–2 by Manchester United at Upton Park.
 26 March 2014: A penalty and an own goal help West Ham see off Hull City 2–1 at Upton Park. Despite the win, the players were booed off at full-time.
 31 March 2014: West Ham beat Sunderland 1–2 at the Stadium of Light thanks to goals from Andy Carroll and Mohamed Diamé. The win puts the club nine points clear of the relegation zone with six games left to play.
 6 April 2014: Two Liverpool penalties see off West ham 1–2 at the Boleyn Ground.
 15 April 2014: Despite taking a 1–0 lead through Matt Jarvis, West Ham are beaten 3–1 by Arsenal at the Emirates Stadium.
 18 April 2014: West Ham youth team striker Dylan Tombides dies aged 20 from testicular cancer.
 19 April 2014: A 0–1 defeat by Crystal Palace is the club's ninth home loss of the season.
 26 April 2014: West Brom defeat West Ham 1–0 at The Hawthorns.
 3 May 2014: West Ham beat Tottenham for the third time this season. A 2–0 home victory also sees Stewart Downing's first goal for West Ham and ensures West Ham a place in the 2014–15 Premier League.
 6 May 2014: Mark Noble is crowned Hammer of the Year for 2013–14 whilst Ravel Morrison wins Goal of the Season for his solo effort against Tottenham in October 2013.
11 May 2014: West Ham are defeated in their final match 2–0 by Premier League champions Manchester City. The club finished 13th.

Final League table

Squad

Results

Pre-season

Guadiana Trophy 
West Ham announced on July 31 that they would take part in the 2013 Guadiana Trophy. Also taking part were Primeira Liga sides Sporting CP and Braga. West Ham finished the two-day tournament in second, behind Braga.

Other matches
West Ham announced on 28 August that they would play a friendly game against Spanish Primera Division side Espanyol during the upcoming international break.

Premier League

Results by matchday

Football League Cup

FA Cup

Statistics

Appearances and goals

|-
! colspan=14 style=background:#dcdcdc; text-align:center| Goalkeepers

|-
! colspan=14 style=background:#dcdcdc; text-align:center| Defenders

|-
! colspan=14 style=background:#dcdcdc; text-align:center| Midfielders

|-
! colspan=14 style=background:#dcdcdc; text-align:center| Forwards

|-
! colspan=14 style=background:#dcdcdc; text-align:center| Players transferred out during the season

|-

Overview

Goalscorers

League position by matchday

Transfers

Summer

In

Out

Winter

In

Out

References

External links 
 West Ham United FC Official Website

West Ham United
West Ham United F.C. seasons
West Ham United
West Ham United